Calamity the Cow was a film made for the Children's Film Foundation in 1967.  The film starred Phil Collins as a teenage actor three years prior to his joining Genesis. The film was written by Kerry Eastman and directed by David Eastman.

Plot summary
Farmer Grant's children (including a young Phil Collins) get him to buy a cow from another farmer. The children work hard to make the cow fit and healthy enough for the show ring. But at the last minute the other farmer, Kincaid, steals Calamity.

Cast 
 John Moulder-Brown -  Rob Grant
 Elizabeth Dear - Jo Grant
 Stephen Brown - Tim Lucas
 Phil Collins - Mike Lucas 
 Josephine Gillick - Beth Lucas
 Grant Taylor -Mr. Grant
 Honor Shepherd -Mrs. Grant
 Alastair Hunter - Kincaid
 Michael Warren -Ringer
 Desmond Carrington - Uncle Jim
 Ken Goodlet - Lefty
 Peter Halliday - Sergeant Watkins

External links
 

Children's Film Foundation
1967 films
1960s British films